Red Dick's Potatoe Garden is the first album by Emil Bulls, released independently in 1997.

Track listing
"Red Dick's Potatoe Garden"
"Windmills"
"Oldskool Desert Trip"
"Simile & Caribbean Space dreams"
"Airborne"
"Cocktail Babe"
"Bulls Reemixxx"
"Beep"
"Egocentric"
"Knitshock Song"
"666"
"Ympaib"
"We Wanna Fuck Alice"

1997 debut albums
Emil Bulls albums